City Heights is a dense urban community in central San Diego, California, known for its ethnic diversity. The area was previously known as East San Diego. City Heights is located south of Mission Valley and northeast of Balboa Park.

City Heights is notable as a home to refugees and immigrants, with significant communities of Vietnamese, Somali, Cambodian, Laotian, and Latino residents. Many social and cultural resources, retail stores, and restaurants are operated by and/or serve the non-white population.

Major commercial streets include University Avenue, El Cajon Boulevard, Fairmount Avenue, and Euclid Avenue. City Heights is densely populated and has mostly multi-family apartments and homes.

History

Colonization of Kumeyaay lands 
Like much of central, southern, and east San Diego County, City Heights sits on Kumeyaay territory. The area was occupied by Spain with the arrival of Spanish soldiers from New Spain and the Baja California peninsula in the 18th century.

When Mexico gained independence from Spain in 1821, it claimed the land and secularized the mission system, distributing the lands to rancheros. When the United States annexed the land, the modern era of American settler colonialism began. Settlement and any later development was facilitated by the forced removal of Kumeyaay people to reservations begun by President Ulysses S. Grant in 1875.

American settlement 
Together they named it "City Heights," though it was also known as the "Steiner, Klauber, Choate and Castle Addition" after the earlier developers of the property. The area was subdivided, and on November 2, 1912, eligible area voters voted to become an incorporated city known as East San Diego. Population boomed in the next few years from 400 in 1910 to 4,000 during the incorporation.

On December 31, 1923, the City of East San Diego voted, 1,344 to 1,109, for annexation into the City of San Diego, becoming once again a neighborhood known as City Heights. The East San Diego trustees did not immediately recognize the annexation in early 1924. Complete annexation occurred over the next few years with the City of San Diego taking over.

Emergence as an urban center 
During most of the 1930s, 1940s, and the 1950s the area had some suburban housing and was a commercial center for middle-class white residents, while people of color were segregated in south and east San Diego through discriminatory housing practices.

In the late 1950s, Caltrans planned the I-15 freeway to cut directly through the area, accelerating white flight and disinvestment. The development of Fashion Valley, Mission Valley and the College Grove Shopping Center siphoned off middle-class customers from the University Avenue and El Cajon Boulevard corridor.

Refugee & immigrant population influx 
Following the Vietnam War, many refugees from Southeast Asia arrived to the United States at Camp Pendleton, San Diego. Many Vietnamese, Cambodian, and Thai refugees settled in City Heights during the 1970s and 80s, due to the cheap rents resulting from disinvestment. From the 1980s to the 1990s, resettlement agencies directed many refugees from the Somali Civil War to City Heights.

During the late 20th century, the area had a high concentration of low-income residents, most of whom were renters and 30% of whom lived below the poverty line. In the anti-welfare and increasingly anti-immigrant climate of the 1990s, exemplified by the passage of Proposition 187 in 1994, public services, healthcare, and welfare became even less accessible. City Heights churches often provided key services and continue to act as community centers.

By the 1990s, the area was described in the local media as one of the "urban edges where the inner city bleeds into the suburbs" and was widely portrayed as a crime hotspot. Drawing on American racism, Somali and African American youth were frequently portrayed, often through "culture of poverty" scripts, as primarily responsible for the crime and poverty in City Heights. Officials believed police intervention was the only measure available to address the deteriorating conditions. Anti-gang programs implemented by police and city leaders targeted and often arrested Somali men for loitering in public or hanging out near businesses.

Price Charities redevelopment & outcomes 
In the mid-1990s, businessman and philanthropist Sol Price led and financed a redevelopment plan to create a multi-block "urban village," of which a new San Diego Police substation was to be the cornerstone. An economic development non-profit (Mid-City Development Corp.) and area homeowners had proposed building the new substation in 1993, however, the city was unable or unwilling to put up the $3 million needed to build the station. With Price's funding, the station opened in 1996.

By 2000, Price had spent $70 million on the redevelopment of City Heights through his "urban village" model. This redevelopment format, which evolved from the Mid-City Communities Plan, became officially codified into the "City of Villages" plan adopted by the City of San Diego in the 2002 General Plan, which continues to guide the city's urban policy.

The late 1990s and early 2000s saw redevelopment in City Heights continue, as new public facilities — including schools, a library, and a community center — opened around the newly developed center, through public-private partnerships. The additional public services and new commercial center were well received by residents. The Price-backed housing developments have received criticism for mainly serving moderate-income people, however, and the general sense of experimentation led some to dub the area "Guinea Pig Heights."

Since the 1990s, the demographics of the neighborhood have been changing. More middle- and upper-class Hispanic and Asian residents have moved to City Heights, while the number of Black residents, particularly those who are low-income, has decreased sharply. Rents and property prices have increased, sometimes by double or triple. The area has still been considered cheaper than other central San Diego areas which have undergone or are undergoing gentrification. It remains home to many refugees and immigrants from Latin America, Africa, Southeast Asia, Western Asia and North Africa.

According to 2017 reports, City Heights has lower rates of violent crime and property crime than nearby North Park and Hillcrest, as well as Downtown Gaslamp, and East Village.

San Diego Magazine named City Heights as one of the best places to live in San Diego in 2015. That year, the San Diego Indiefest music festival took place in City Heights' Urban Village. Recent developments have included an alternative fuel station, a new retail complex with some mixed-use developments, several expanded schools, and new parks.

By 2019, the area had been designated as an "Economic Opportunity Zone," which qualifies investors for tax breaks and other forms of corporate welfare, a policy which may accelerate the displacement of low-income residents. Gentrification in North Park has been trickling up University Avenue towards City Heights, with new events and businesses drawing higher-income residents, many of whom are middle- and upper-class Hispanic professionals, to the area.

Geography
City Heights is large and diffuse, with many sub-neighborhoods. The community is divided into two pieces by Fairmount Avenue: City Heights East and City Heights West. The community is bounded by Interstate 805 to the west, El Cajon Boulevard to the north, 54th Street to the east, and Home Avenue/Euclid Avenue/Chollas Parkway to the southeast.

"Downtown" City Heights is generally regarded to be in the Teralta West neighborhood, and along University Avenue.

The community is further divided into fourteen neighborhoods: Azalea-Hollywood Park, Castle, Cherokee Point, Chollas Creek, Colina Del Sol, Corridor, Fairmount Park, Fairmount Village, Fox Canyon, Islenair (a city-designated historic district), Teralta East, Teralta West, Swan Canyon, and Ridgeview-Webster.

Like other urban neighborhoods north of Balboa Park, City Heights also has a high rate of pedestrian activity relative to the rest of San Diego.

Demographics
City Heights had an estimated population of 65,552 as of 2020, according to SANDAG. City Heights is majority Hispanic and low-income, with high rates of poverty, unemployment, child obesity, and asthma.

City Heights is home to significant Vietnamese, Somali, Cambodian, and Laotian communities.

70% of households make less than $44,999, with median household income at $29,710 as of 2015, adjusted for inflation.

The median age is approximately 30 years old. Most housing in City Heights is multi-family.

Significant Places

The annual International Village Celebration is held around late spring or early summer and is aimed at highlighting the community's diversity.

Public services, non-profits & medical 

 City Heights/Weingart Library and Performance Annex, 3795 Fairmount Ave., San Diego, CA 92105
 City Heights Family Health Center, 5454 El Cajon Blvd., San Diego, CA 92115 (se habla español) 
 La Maestra Community Health Centers City Heights, 4060 Fairmount Ave., San Diego, CA 92105 (se habla español)
 City Heights Community Development, providing "One Month Away" eviction prevention program. 4001 El Cajon Blvd., Suite 205, San Diego, CA 92105

Churches 
Some key community churches include:

 Our Lady of the Sacred Heart Catholic Church, 4177 Marlborough Ave, San Diego, CA (619) 280–0515.  Founded 1911, diverse parish offering Masses and ministries in English, Tigrinya, and Vietnamese.
 Wesley United Methodist Church, offering food distribution and English, Vietnamese, and Cambodian Ministries. 5380 El Cajon Blvd, San Diego, CA
 Fairmount Baptist Church, (619) 284–2392, 4100 Fairmount Ave, San Diego, CA 92105

Cuisine

Vietnamese, Chinese, Mexican, Somali, and Eritrean/Ethiopian restaurants are located along the main commercial streets of University Avenue, El Cajon Boulevard and Fairmount Avenue.

Art

 Creating Community Through Art: The AjA Project's gallery space on Fairmont Avenue features photographs taken by immigrants. Stories of new generations of Americans are captured in the images displayed at the AjA Project's 4,000 square foot gallery and education center, located in a charming ranch style building that used to be the local branch library.

Environment 

 Chollas Creek Restoration Project 2020-2022: Chollas Creek will be renovated with a $3.5 million grant from the California Natural Resources Agency. The area will be made walkable, with the removal concrete from the creek and addition of walkways, bike paths and native plant life alongside a half-mile segment of Chollas Creek that runs beside Martin Luther King Freeway (state Route 94).
 Gardens: There is the New Roots Community Farm and the San Diego Peace Garden, which also holds an annual Kale Festival. City Heights canyons include the Fox, Swan and Olivia Canyons.
 The Azalea Park Arts District (APAD): The Manzanita Gathering Place was built to be a creative refuge awash in art at the opening at Manzanita Canyon, with canopies and columns incorporating mosaic tiles made by Azalea Park residents. At the Azalea Community Park, local artists have created the Water Conservation Garden, with a collection of succulent plants and sculpture.

Businesses

Vietnamese, Chinese, Mexican, Somali, and Eritrean/Ethiopian restaurants are located along the main commercial streets of University Avenue, El Cajon Boulevard and Fairmount Avenue. There are also pubs and bars, such as the historic Tower Bar, Black Cat Bar & Soda Bar.

Little Saigon
The Little Saigon San Diego Foundation was established in November 2008 with a stated mission to "revitalize the densely populated Vietnamese business district of El Cajon Boulevard."

On June 4, 2013, City Council approved Little Saigon Cultural and Commercial District in City Heights, which is a six-block section of El Cajon Boulevard from Euclid to Highland avenues. The district would be known as a center for Vietnamese food and culture. Since 2013, the Little Saigon San Diego Foundation has organized one of the Vietnamese new year (Tết) events in the city with the annual Lunar New Year festival at the SDCCU Stadium (formerly known as Qualcomm Stadium), where proceeds would go towards developing and promoting the district. The foundation's festival is a separate event and does not have any affiliation with the  San Diego Tết Festival organized by VAYA (Vietnamese-American Youth Alliance), which was established in 2006 and annually held at Mira Mesa Community Park.

On February 1, 2019, the Little Saigon signs were revealed to be installed near El Cajon Boulevard exits on Interstate 15.

Transportation
City Heights has walkable neighborhoods with many of the restaurants, businesses and shops near the main residential pockets. It is common to see pedestrians, cyclists and scooters throughout the neighborhood and surrounding communities. Centrally located within San Diego, City Heights has easy access to freeways, Mission Valley commercial centers and the downtown area. University Avenue, El Cajon Boulevard and Fairmount Avenue are the major thoroughfares.

Because of the presence of the University Avenue transit corridor (the busiest in the metro region), City Heights has substantial bus service connecting to Downtown and the Mission Valley trolley stops. Bus lines serviced by the City Heights Transit Plaza are the 235-RAPID, 7, 10, 60, and 965.

Education
City Heights is home to twelve public elementary schools, three public middle schools, two public high schools, and two private grade schools, and three charter schools.

All public schools are in the San Diego Unified School District.

Public elementary schools
 Cherokee Point
 Hamilton 
 Euclid 
 Marshall 
 Edison 
 Central
 Florence Griffith Joyner 
 Herbert Ibarra 
 Mary Lanyon Fay 
 Wilson 
 Rowan 
 Rosa Parks

Public middle schools
 Clark (Monroe) 
 Wilson 
 Mann

Public high schools
 Hoover High School
 Crawford Educational Complex (former Will C. Crawford High School)
 Community Health and Medical Practices School (CHAMPS)
 Invention and Design Educational Academy (IDEA)
 School of Law and Business (LAB)
 Multimedia and Visual Arts School (MVAS)

Charter schools
 Health Sciences High & Middle College (HSHMC)
 Health Sciences Middle School
 City Heights Prep Academy
 Gompers Preparatory Academy
 San Diego Global Vision Academy
Arroyo Paseo Charter High* School
Iftin Charter School

Private grade schools
 Waldorf School of San Diego

Private high schools
Waldorf School of San Diego High School

Government
The area is part of City Council District 9, currently represented by Sean Elo-Rivera. City Heights is also part of California's 80th State Assembly district, currently represented by Lorena Gonzalez. The City Heights Area Planning Committee advises the city on land use and other issues. Volunteer organizations include the City Heights Town Council and the City Heights Business Association.

References

External links 

Neighborhoods in San Diego
Urban communities in San Diego